Bangladesh–Jordan relations refer to the bilateral relations between Bangladesh and Jordan.

History 
During the Indo-Pakistani War of 1971, President Nixon encouraged Jordan to send military supplies to Pakistan. With Nixon's permission, Jordan sent ten F-104 aircraft and was promised replacements from the United States. Six of Jordan's aircraft failed to return.

Agricultural cooperation 
In 2011, Bangladesh and Jordan signed a memorandum of understanding on agricultural cooperation. According to the MoU, the two countries "will exchange scientific materials and information and exchange visits of scientists and engineers in the areas of agricultural science and technology, field level extension, agricultural production and agro-processing." Under the MoU, Bangladesh and Jordan plan to form a joint working group consisting of experts from both countries to facilitate cooperation in the sector.

Economic relations 
Bangladesh and Jordan have expressed interest in expanding trade and investment. Jordan is one of the largest Bangladeshi labour export markets.  In 2011, Jordan lifted a ban on the importation of labour from Bangladesh but tightened the recruitment process soon after as a result of some cases of sexual exploitation of the female workers and labor strikes. In 2012, Bangladesh and Jordan signed a memorandum of understanding in order to monitor migration, ensure the safety of migrants and reduce migration costs. In the same year, Bangladesh and Jordan prepared a draft agreement to enhance cooperation on trade. According to the agreement, the two countries will grant "Most Favored Nation" status to each other and establish a joint trade committee.

Bangladeshi labour in Jordan 
As of 2011, there were about 30,000 Bangladeshis living in Jordan, with most working in service industries.

Bangladeshi Embassy 
The Bangladeshi embassy is located in Amman.

 Ambassador Nahida Sobhan

Jordan Embassy 
The Jordan embassy is located in Dhaka.

See also 
 Foreign relations of Bangladesh    
 Foreign relations of Jordan

References 

 
Jordan
Bilateral relations of Jordan